I'Anson may refer to:

Charlie I'Anson (born 1993), English footballer 
Chaz I'Anson (born 1986), English rugby league player
Edward I'Anson (1812–1888), English architect
Henry I'Anson (1734–1767), English naval commander
Hugh I'Anson Fausset (1895–1965), English writer
I'Anson baronets (1652–1800), 17th and 18th-century title in the Baronetage of England
Lawrence W. I'Anson (1907–1990), Virginia Supreme Court judge
Lisa I'Anson (born 1965), British broadcaster
Thomas John I'Anson Bromwich (1875–1929), English mathematician
I'Anson (musician), British musician